Michael Lewis Montgomery, II (born August 18, 1983) is a former gridiron football defensive end. He was drafted by the Green Bay Packers in the sixth round of the 2005 NFL Draft. He played college football at Texas A&M.

Montgomery was also a member of the Minnesota Vikings, Las Vegas Locomotives and Montreal Alouettes.

College career
Montgomery was born in Carthage, Texas and attended Center High School in Center, Texas. He played college football at Navarro Junior College and Texas A&M. He started his career at Navarro where he played for two years recording 131 tackles and six sacks. Before his junior year he transferred to Texas A&M where he recorded 123 tackles, seven sacks, and one interception, and earned  first-team All-Big 12 honors.

Professional career

Green Bay Packers
Montgomery was drafted by the Green Bay Packers in the sixth round of the 2005 NFL Draft. For the first three years of his career he was used mainly as a backup defensive end.

During the 2008 season, after the Packers lost starting defensive end Cullen Jenkins due to injury and released Kabeer Gbaja-Biamila, Montgomery along with rookie Jeremy Thompson split time starting at defensive end. He finished the season starting eight games.

After becoming an unrestricted free agent after 2008, Montgomery re-signed with the Packers on March 23, 2009. During the season, he recorded only two tackles in 10 games.

Montgomery was released on March 5, 2010. In five years with the team he started eight of 56 games, recording 123 tackles and five sacks.

Minnesota Vikings
Montgomery signed with the Minnesota Vikings on March 29, 2010.  The Vikings released Montgomery on September 4, 2010, as the team made final cuts to set its 53-man roster.

Second stint with Packers
Montgomery again joined the Packers on October 15, 2010. He was later released on November 2, 2010 after appearing in only two games for Green Bay.

References

External links
 Just Sports Stats
 Montreal Alouettes bio

1983 births
Living people
People from Carthage, Texas
Players of American football from Texas
American football defensive tackles
American football defensive ends
Navarro Bulldogs football players
Texas A&M Aggies football players
Green Bay Packers players
Minnesota Vikings players
People from Center, Texas
Las Vegas Locomotives players
Montreal Alouettes players